This is a list of episodes from the 1959–1963 United States television series Dennis the Menace. The series is based on the Hank Ketcham comic strip of the same name.

Series overview

Episodes

Season 1 (1959–60)

Season 2 (1960–61)

Season 3 (1961–62)

Season 4 (1962–63)

References

External links 

 

Lists of American sitcom episodes